Mügge Island is one of the Bennett Islands, lying  north of the west end of Weertman Island in Hanusse Bay. Mapped from air photos taken by Ronne Antarctic Research Expedition (RARE) (1947–48) and Falkland Islands and Dependencies Aerial Survey Expedition (FIDASE) (1956–57). It was named by the United Kingdom Antarctic Place-Names Committee (UK-APC) for Johannes O.C. Mügge (1858-1932), a German mineralogist who made pioneer studies of the plasticity of ice, in 1895.

See also 
 List of Antarctic and sub-Antarctic islands

Islands of Graham Land
Loubet Coast